Lake Haçlı (also known as Lake Bulanık) is a fresh-water lake in Turkey.

It is situated on a high plateau of  

The area and the depth don't fluctuate between summer and winter. The lake is fed by Şeyhkorum Creek and some smaller creeks.

Fauna 
Gadwall, ruddy shelduck, demoiselle crane are among the bird population of the lake. Animal husbandry is one of the major economic activities around the lake. Fishing is only of minor importance.

References

Hacli
Landforms of Muş Province
Bulancak District
Important Bird Areas of Turkey